Kosovan–Polish relations are foreign relations between Kosovo and Poland. Kosovo declared its independence from Serbia on 17 February 2008 and Poland recognised it on 26 February 2008. Poland was the first Slavic country to do so.

Consular relations
Kosovo and Poland established consular relations on 8 November 2022.

Military
Poland currently has 274 troops serving in Kosovo as peacekeepers in the NATO led Kosovo Force. Originally there were 800 Polish troops in KFOR.

See also 
 Foreign relations of Kosovo
 Foreign relations of Poland
 Poland–Serbia relations
 Albania–Poland relations
 Poland–Yugoslavia relations

Notes and references
Notes:

References:

 
Poland
Bilateral relations of Poland